Leta Mae Rains Andrews (born July 7, 1937) is a retired American high school basketball coach who holds the record for the most wins by a high school basketball coach.

Biography
Andrews was born near Granbury and graduated from Granbury High School in 1955. She grew up with brothers Walter and George, and sister Shirley who also played and later coached girls basketball.

Clyde Rains held Shirley back for one year in school so she and Leta could play basketball together for four years in high school. Together, the Rains sisters led Granbury to the state championship game in 1954 and 1955, losing both years to Dimmitt.

Coaching career
Andrews coached high school basketball for fifty-two years at five high schools in Texas from 1962-2014, leading those teams to sixteen state Final Four appearances, and a state championship in 1990. Andrews served as Head coach of the McDonald’s All-American Game West team in 2004, and the Gatorade All-America team in 2009. In 2007 she was named the NHSCA National High School Coach of the Year, and received the Morgan Wootten Lifetime Achievement Award. She was inducted into the High School Basketball Hall of Fame in 1995, the Women’s Basketball Hall of Fame in 2010, and the Texas Sports Hall of Fame in 2012. She is a three-time finalist for induction into the Naismith Memorial Basketball Hall of Fame (2015, 2016, 2019).

With her 1,218th win on December 9, 2005, Andrews became the nation’s winningest high school girls’ coach, passing Bradley Central High School (Cleveland, Tennessee) coach Jim Smiddy. She became the winningest high school coach basketball coach (boys or girls) on December 7, 2010, with 1,334 wins, passing retired Dunbar High School coach Robert Hughes, Sr.

Personal life
Andrews was married to her husband David Andrews (March 6, 1937 – March 28, 2018) for 62 years. She and David raised three daughters who were each Texas All-State high school basketball players, all of whom played college basketball for Hall of Fame coach Jody Conradt at the University of Texas. Daughter Linda Andrews Waggoner is a retired high school girls basketball coach who is also a member of the Texas High School Basketball Hall of Fame (1999), and the University of Texas Sports Hall of Fame (2003).

Popular culture
Narrated by NBA Basketball Hall of Famer Bill Walton, It’s All in the Game: The Leta Andrews Story, is a documentary film that tells the story of Andrews' upbringing on the family farm outside of Granbury.

References 

1937 births
High school basketball coaches in Texas
American women's basketball coaches
Basketball coaches from Texas
Basketball players from Texas
Living people
People from Granbury, Texas
Weatherford College alumni
Texas Wesleyan University alumni